Donald Southgate may refer to:

Donald W. Southgate (1887–1953), American architect
Donald Southgate (historian) (1924–2005), British historian